Pristimantis nicefori is a species of frog in the family Strabomantidae. It is found in Colombia and Venezuela. Its natural habitat is tropical high-altitude grassland. It is threatened by habitat loss.

References

nicefori
Amphibians of Colombia
Amphibians of Venezuela
Amphibians described in 1970
Taxonomy articles created by Polbot